Paderu is a town located in the Indian state of Andhra Pradesh. It is the administrative headquarters of ASR district, and the Headquarters of Paderu revenue division and Paderu Mandal.

Geography
It has an average elevation of 904 meters (2,969 feet).

References

Villages in Alluri Sitharama Raju district